Nils Sture may refer to: 
Nils Stensson Sture (1512–1527/28), supposedly the daljunkern
Nils Svantesson Sture (1543–1567), Swedish diplomat and soldier killed in the Sture Murders
Nils Bosson Sture (1426–1494), Swedish noble